(Edward) Ambrose Hardy was Archdeacon of Malta from 1889 to 1897.

After a curacy at Holy Trinity, Coventry he was Secretary of the Curates' Augmentation Fund. He was a Chaplain in Cyprus before moving to Malta in 1881.

Notes

Alumni of Dorchester Missionary College
Archdeacons of Malta
19th-century Maltese Anglican priests